"Reunion" is episode 10 of season 2 in the television show Angel.

Plot
Angel tells his associates that Drusilla has returned and, working with Wolfram & Hart, has made Darla a vampire again. Wesley and Cordelia investigate the law firm's plans for Drusilla and Darla as Angel prepares to stake the two vampires. In an attempt to find Drusilla and Darla, Angel goes to Lindsey’s apartment, who has been sheltering Drusilla, however he has already moved. The property manager stops by and remarks that Lindsey's cousin - a "sweet, but very odd English girl" - is visiting him and is expecting a daughter, whom she wanted to be born near the stars. Gunn realizes that Drusilla has taken Darla, who is dead until she wakes as a newly made vampire, to a plant nursery. Angel locates Darla, who is wrapped in a shroud and shallowly buried in a raised box of dirt. He attempts to stake the unconscious Darla, but Drusilla attacks him. Darla revives as Angel and Drusilla struggle; she escapes and Drusilla disappears.

At Wolfram & Hart, Holland and Lindsey are discussing the evening's planned party when Drusilla arrives to update them on recent events. Darla appears and drags Drusilla off. As Angel races to the W&H offices, Cordelia has a vision which sends them elsewhere. Darla confronts Drusilla for making her a vampire; Drusilla admits she is feeling very lonely and she wanted to save Darla. After bloodsucking and killing a fresh victim, Darla has her old confidence restored and takes Drusilla shopping.

While driving to find Drusilla and Darla, Cordelia has a vision which detours their mission. Angel brusquely completes the mission from Cordelia's vision, then heads back toward Wolfram & Hart. Holland unleashes Darla and Drusilla on Los Angeles; they begin by raiding a clothing store for new wardrobes, killing two salespeople. Angel forces his way into Wolfram & Hart, demanding information. Lindsey refuses; Angel is arrested and taken into custody by Kate. She releases him, hoping he can stop Darla and Drusilla's killing spree.

Holland hosts a wine tasting party for his colleagues in his home's wine cellar. As he makes a speech, Darla and Drusilla appear, intent on slaughter. Holland attempts to convince the two that he and his associates are their allies, to little effect. Angel finds a survivor at the clothing store and learns where Darla and Drusilla have gone. When he arrives at Holland's home, however, he refuses to stop Darla and Drusilla, instead locking the wine cellar to prevent the lawyers from escaping the vampires.

When Angel tells his associates what he has done, they object, fearing that Angel is descending into corruption and darkness. He fires them and leaves.

Writing

Arc significance
Angel snaps and goes to extreme measures, letting Darla and Drusilla kill Holland Manners and many other employees of Wolfram & Hart (and, possibly, their spouses/dates for the occasion)
Angel fires Wesley, Gunn and Cordelia, furthering his descent into darkness and despair.

Continuity
Drusilla sings "Run and Catch" while standing over Darla's body, a song she says her mother used to sing to her in the Buffy episode "Lie to Me".

Errors
Before Darla rises into a vampire, Angel removes a veil covering her face.  During the fight with Drusilla the veil is back in place.
While the veil is lifted, the veins in Darla's neck are visibly pulsing, despite the fact she is supposed to be dead.
When Cordelia has a vision causing Angel to perform a U-turn, skid marks are visible on the road from previous takes.
During the same U-turn sequence as the car swerves, all other characters can be seen as their stunt doubles excluding Cordelia who appears as a mannequin.

Reception
The Futon Critic named it the 20th best episode of 2000, saying the episode had several jaw-dropping moments and that he "never wanted to see the next episode of a series more than this one."

References

External links

 

Angel (season 2) episodes
2000 American television episodes
Television episodes about mass murder
Television episodes written by Tim Minear